George Iliev Andreytchine (January 19, 1894, Belitsa  - 20 April, 1950, Moscow) was a Bulgarian political activist active in Bulgaria, the United States and the Soviet Union. After emigrating to the USA in 1913, he played a prominent part in the Industrial Workers of the World (IWW). In 1918 he was one of the IWW leaders arrested for “anti-war propaganda” under the Espionage Act of 1917. He was released on bail and later in 1921 left for Russia where he became the American representative on the executive committee of the Red International of Labor Unions. He joined the Communist Party of the Soviet Union, wherein he was aligned with Leon Trotsky.

References

1894 births
1950 deaths
Bulgarian communists
Industrial Workers of the World members
Industrial Workers of the World leaders
Bulgarian emigrants to the United States